Europop is the debut album by Italian electronic group Eiffel 65. The album was released in late 1999 as under Bliss Corporation and Universal Records and Republic Music (Universal and Republic would merge to Universal Republic). The album is most notable for the group's two biggest hits: "Blue (Da Ba Dee)" and "Move Your Body," which topped the charts worldwide in 2000.

Music 
The title of Europop describes its genre; it combines several dance styles unique to European countries, such as the United Kingdom's trip hop, Germany's techno, and Italy's dance music, and songs are structured like a typical pop song. The album follows a deep house template featuring vocoder vocal effects, synthesizer hooks, and "nursery rhyme choruses," with occasional deviations from it into string-orchestrated hip-hop ("Living in a Bubble") and "trippy" house stylings ("Now is Forever" and "Europop"). Elements of 1980s synthpop dominate, with reviews making comparisons to Depeche Mode (especially towards "Your Clown"), Erasure, A-ha, and Duran Duran.

Lyrics 
Although some of its tracks are self-indulgent and facile, Europop generally incorporates social commentary on deceptions and connections between humans. Explained Jey, "We like to speak of how things affect human beings without saying 'This is bad' or 'We want to drown everyone who does that.'" "Living in a Bubble"'s message is making sure what's real in "a place of lies and hype"; specifically, according to Jey, it is about how celebrities have people they encounter be unusually "friendly and openhearted right away" when popular, only for that to change when their fame decreases. The subject of "Silicon World" dreams of "a silicon girl with silicon lips and silicon hair" he'll never meet. "Too Much of Heaven" critiques societies' fixation on wealth and its effects on morality, while "Blue (Da Ba Dee)" is about someone where "everything is blue for him" due to a need to be heard. 

Europop features references to consumer technology. In "Hyperlink (Deep Down)", the subject displays lust through computer terminology like "a sexual browser" and "a hyperlink to go inside you," and a tribute to the PlayStation, "My Console," that references games such as Resident Evil, Tekken 3 and Bloody Roar. There are also songs about love and relationships, including the aforementioned "Silicon World" and "Hyperlink (Deep Down)" as well as "Your Clown," which depicts the subject trying to get out of an abusive love triangle caused by his girlfriend.

Sound
The album features pitch-corrected vocals and Euro disco beats throughout. Eiffel 65 perform all the songs on this album in English.

Reception

Contemporaneous reviews from Entertainment Weekly, the Houston Chronicle, and The Plain Dealer welcomed the humorous, light-weight dance-pop style of Europop in a pop music market saturated with mostly dour music, calling serious cuts such as "Your Clown" and "Now is Forever" the LP's weakest. Reviews from The Plain Dealer and Rolling Stone also appreciated its rejection of intellectual pretentiousness common in electronic music. On the other hand, the album was criticized for a lack of differentiation (in composition and production techniques) between songs, with Promis writing its best moments came when it combined its template with different genres. In his review for Courier News, Tab Benoit called Eiffel 65 a "one-trick pony" for using the same vocal effect for all tracks.

The album peaked at number four on the Billboard 200 in the United States, and the song "Blue (Da Ba Dee)" peaked at number six on the Billboard Hot 100, impressive for an EDM song at the time of its release. In February 2000, the album was certified two-times platinum by the Recording Industry Association of America (RIAA) for shipments of two million copies in the US.

Track listing

Charts

Weekly charts

Year-end charts

Certifications

References

External links 
 Eiffel 65's Europop in Amazon.com
 Eiffel 65's Europop in MSN music
 Eiffel 65's Europop in Rhapsody

1999 debut albums
Eiffel 65 albums
Republic Records albums
Universal Records albums